Colaspis nigrocyanea is a species of leaf beetle from North America. It is distributed in Arizona and Mexico. It was first described by the British entomologist George Robert Crotch in 1873.

References

Further reading

 

Eumolpinae
Articles created by Qbugbot
Beetles described in 1873
Taxa named by George Robert Crotch
Beetles of North America